Josefina García-Marruz Badía (28 April 1923 – 27 June 2022), known artistically as  Fina García Marruz, was a Cuban poet and literary researcher.

Life 
García Marruz was born in Havana on 28 April 1923. She received numerous awards, including the National Prize for Literature (1990), Pablo Neruda Ibero-American Poetry Award (2007), and the Reina Sofía de Poesía Iberoamericana (2011). García Marruz died on 27 June 2022, at the age of 99.

Selected works

Poetry 

 Poemas, 1942
 Transfiguración de Jesús en el Monte, Orígenes, 1947
 Las miradas perdidas  1944–1950, 1951
 Visitaciones, 1970
 Poesías escogidas,  Letras Cubanas, 1984
 Viaje a Nicaragua, with Cintio Vitier, 1987
 Créditos de Charlot, 1990
 Los Rembrandt de l'Hermitage, 1992
 Viejas melodías, 1993
 Nociones elementales y algunas elegías, 1994
 Habana del centro, 1997
 Antología poética, 1997
 Poesía escogida, with Cintio Vitier, 1999
 El instante raro, Pre-Textos, 2010
 ¿De qué, silencio, eres tú, silencio?, 2011

Essays and critiques 

 Estudios críticos, with Cintio Vitier, 1964
 Poesías de Juana Borrero, 1967
 Los versos de Martí, 1968
 Temas martianos, with Cintio Vitier, 1969
 Bécquer o la leve bruma, 1971
 Poesías y cartas, with Cintio Vitier, 1977
 Flor oculta de poesía cubana, with Cintio Vitier, 1978
 Temas martianos, segunda serie, 1982
 Hablar de la poesía, Letras Cubanas, 1986
 Textos antimperialistas de José Martí, 1990
 La literatura en el Papel Periódico de La Habana, with Cintio Vitier and Roberto Friol, 1991
 Temas martianos, tercera serie, 1993
 La familia de "Orígenes", 1997
 Darío, Martí y lo germinal americano, 2001
 Juana Borrero y otros ensayos, 2011

Awards

Prizes 

 Premio de la Crítica Literaria 1987 for Hablar de la poesía
 Premio Nacional de Literatura de Cuba 1990.
 Premio de la Crítica Literaria 1991 for Créditos de Charlot
 Premio de la Crítica Literaria 1992 for Los Rembrandt de l'Hermitage
 Premio de la Crítica Literaria 1996 for Habana del centro
 Premio de la Crítica Literaria 2001 for Darío, Martí y lo germinal americano
 Premio Nacional de Investigación Cultural 2005
 Pablo Neruda Ibero-American Poetry Award 2007
 Premio Reina Sofía de Poesía Iberoamericana 2011
 Premio Internacional de Poesía Federico García Lorca 2011

Distinctions 

 Orden Alejo Carpentier, 1988
 Orden Félix Varela, 1995
 Medalla 30 aniversario de la Academia de Ciencias de Cuba
 Medalla Fernando Ortiz
 Distinción, Cultura Nacional
 Distinción, Raúl Gómez García
 Distinción 23 de agosto, Federación de Mujeres Cubanas
 Hija Adoptiva de Bayamo
 Orden José Martí

References 

1923 births
2022 deaths
20th-century Cuban poets
Cuban women poets
20th-century Cuban women writers
Writers from Havana
21st-century Cuban poets
21st-century Cuban women writers